María Corina Porro Martínez (born 1 December 1953) is a Spanish politician. She was a member of the Vigo local government with the Galician People's Party between 1995 and 1999. She was Chief Director of Social Services between 1999 and 2001. She became a deputy in the Parliament of Galicia and Councillor of Social Services in the 2002-2003 period. In 2003 Corina Porro was elected mayor of Vigo in 2003 after a censure motion against the socialist  Ventura Pérez Mariño approved by 10 members from Galician People's Party and seven from Bloque Nacionalista Galego and rejected by eight members of Socialists' Party of Galicia and two from Progresistas Vigueses.

See also 
Port of Vigo

References 
 Corina Porro official biography at Spanish Senate website. Access date 29 Jan. 2010

1953 births
Living people
Vigo
People from Ferrol, Spain
Mayors of places in Galicia
People's Party (Spain) politicians
Members of the Senate of Spain
20th-century Spanish politicians
20th-century Spanish women politicians
21st-century Spanish politicians
21st-century Spanish women politicians
Members of the 6th Parliament of Galicia